Aerenea flavofasciculata is a species of beetle in the family Cerambycidae. It was described by Stephan von Breuning in 1948. It is known from Peru.

References

Compsosomatini
Beetles described in 1948